Martin Mills (born 12 May 1949) is the founder and chairman of the Beggars Group.

Early life
Mills grew up near Aylesbury, Buckinghamshire and comes from an "upper-middle-class English family". His father was a civil servant and his mother was as a teacher and headmistress. Mills attended Magdalen College School and Oriel College, Oxford, where he studied Philosophy, politics and economics, graduating in 1970.

After graduating from Oxford, Mills worked for the Office of Population, Census and Surveys, writing reports on abortion law reformation and processing abortion statistics; however, the experience left him wanting "to do something completely different". After leaving, he found a job at a record store in Notting Hill, where Mills realized his future was in the music industry. Eventually he opened a record store of his own (Beggars Banquet) and was promoting concerts.

Beggars Group

The record store was opened initially to re-sell records that he and a friend, Nick Austin, had collected for a mobile disco. The disco, and then the company, was named after the Rolling Stones' album Beggars Banquet. Martin and Nick had seen an opportunity for a record shop that sold both new and second-hand records. Beggars Banquet soon became a six-store chain in London, arriving shortly before punk broke through; “It turned what we did upside down. We all started being interested in a completely different style of music. The kind of concerts we had been promoting suddenly became completely irrelevant, so we started promoting punk gigs instead. It was an amazing, incredibly exciting sea change."

His company is now one of the world's most successful independent groups of record labels. His ability to spot future trends in music has been celebrated by the BBC Radio 4 Zeitgeisters series, and has included New Romantic, Gary Numan electronic, Goth rock of the 1980s and being ahead of the popular trend for digital downloads. In the radio show he was quoted as saying that The whole point [of independent music publishing] is not giving people what they want but what they are going to want.

With the company continuing to grow as the industry morphs and throws new challenges, Martin has led the worldwide drive to future-proof the independent sector, working hard to promote its collective interests and helping unite like-minded labels and companies. Having served on the BPI (British Phonographic Industry) Council, the governing body of the record industry, from 1987 to 2000, he quit to become the progenitor of the Association of Independent Music in the UK, and similar bodies in Europe (Impala) and the US (A2IM), and the Worldwide Independent Network.

These bodies speak eloquently, effectively and with great authority to ensure a level playing field and the welfare, success and sustainability of independent music makers.

He also led the establishment of Merlin in 2008, the independents’ rights licensing body, which has distributed well over $2 billion to members since launch, and today counts 850 members from 63 countries.

He has remained active in other music industry organisations, through his participation in the government’s Music Industry Forum, the Music Business Forum, being on the board of UK Music, and both as a director of PPL and VPL, the industry’s rights licensing bodies. In addition, he was called by the US Senate to Washington in 2012 to be a witness in the hearing on the proposed purchase of EMI Records by Universal Music.

He was awarded an MBE in the 2008 New Year Honours list, as well as outstanding contribution awards from Music Week, Billboard, the Radio Academy, the Featured Artists Coalition, IMPALA, Canadian Music Week, The Music Producers’ Guild, A2IM, Billboard, and the 'Pioneer Award' at the AIM Awards.

As of 2023, the labels that comprise the Beggars Group are 4AD, Matador Records, Rough Trade Records, XL Recordings and Young.

Awards and Accolades
1998: The Strat award, Music Week
2008: Honored by The Queen with an MBE
2011: Industry Champion Award at the inaugural Artist & Manager Awards
2011: The Guardian – Inaugural Music Power 100 list
2011: Impala Outstanding Contribution Award
2012: Inaugural Lifetime Achievement award by A2IM
2012: Music Producers Guild Outstanding Contribution to UK Music Award
2013: Billboard - Industry Icon award
2013: Billboard - Power 100
2014: The Inaugural Global Impact Award at Canadian Music Week
2014: Pioneer Award at the AIM Independent Music Awards
2014: Billboard - International Power Player
2014: Billboard - Power 100
2015: Billboard - Power 100
2016: Billboard - Power 100
2017: Billboard - Power 100
2017: Billboard - Indie Power Player
2018: Billboard - Indie Power Player
2018: Variety International Music Leader
2019: Billboard - Power 100
2019: Billboard - Indie Power Player
2019: Variety - International Music Leader
2020: Billboard - Indie Power Player
2020: Billboard - Power 100
2021: Billboard - Indie Power Player
2022: Billboard - Indie Power Player
2022: Billboard - Power List 
2022: Variety - Variety 500 
2023: Billboard - Power 100

Commentary
In June 2013, Mills was described in a BBC Radio 4 portrait as looking "remarkably unremarkable" but being "like a wise old fisherman watching minnows waiting to catch a really big fish".

References

External links
 Martin Mills biography on Music Tank website

1949 births
Alumni of Oriel College, Oxford
Beggars Group
British music industry executives
Living people